"My Twin" is a single by Swedish metal band Katatonia in 2006. It was the first single off the band's seventh studio album The Great Cold Distance. The single's music video was directed by Charlie Granberg. The single charted at no. 9 on the Finnish music charts.

Track listing

Personnel
Katatonia
 Jonas Renkse – vocals, guitar, keyboards, loops, programming, sound effects
 Anders Nyström – guitar, keyboard, loops, programming, sound effects
 Fredrick Norrman – guitar
 Mattias Norrman – bass
 Daniel Liljekvist – drums

Additional personnel
 Jens Bogren – keyboards, loops, programming, sound effects
 David Castillo – keyboards, loops, programming, sound effects
 Peter Damin – drum tech, percussion

References

2006 singles
2006 songs